The Garvin County Courthouse, at Courthouse Sq. and Grant Ave. in Pauls Valley, Oklahoma, is a historic courthouse designed by architect Jewell Hicks.  It was listed on the National Register of Historic Places in 1985.

It is also included in the Pauls Valley Historic District

References

Courthouses in Oklahoma
National Register of Historic Places in Garvin County, Oklahoma
Neoclassical architecture in Oklahoma
Government buildings completed in 1918
1918 establishments in Oklahoma